St. Paul's Higher Secondary School is a school in Vepery, Chennai, Tamil Nadu, India.

The school, founded in 1716, was initially meant for students from an underprivileged background and at present, it has students from varied social backgrounds in Classes V to XII from both the Tamil and English medium streams.

References

High schools and secondary schools in Chennai
Educational institutions established in 1716
1716 establishments in Asia
1710s establishments in India